Ruslan Sharapov (born 22 June 1967) is a Belarusian judoka. He competed at the 1996 Summer Olympics and the 2000 Summer Olympics.

Achievements

References

External links

1967 births
Living people
Belarusian male judoka
Judoka at the 1996 Summer Olympics
Judoka at the 2000 Summer Olympics
Olympic judoka of Belarus